Ahmad Ellaz (born 14 May 1990) is a Lebanese rugby league player who has represented his country. His position is usually in the back row.

Playing career
Ellaz has represented Lebanon at the 2009 European Cup, during qualification for the 2013 World Cup, in the 2014 Hayne/Mannah Cup and during qualification for the 2017 World Cup.

Ellaz joined Newtown in 2011 and quickly cemented his position at lock. He won the award for the Most Consistent Player at the 2011 Newtown RLFC Presentation Night. At the end of the year he was named as a member of New South Wales Cup Team of the Year.  In 2017, Ellaz played for the Auburn Warriors in the Ron Massey Cup competition.

References

External links
Newtown Jets Player Profile*
EUROPEAN CUP - RANKING MATCH - IRELAND 16 LEBANON 40
(archived by web.archive.org) Statistics at rlwc2017.com

1990 births
Living people
Expatriate rugby league players in Australia
Lebanese expatriate rugby league players
Lebanese expatriate sportspeople in Australia
Lebanese rugby league players
Lebanon national rugby league team players
Newtown Jets NSW Cup players
Rugby league locks
Rugby league second-rows